The Fium'Alto (or Fium'Altu) is a small coastal river in the department of Haute-Corse, Corsica, France.

Course

It crosses the communes of Carcheto-Brustico, Casalta, Croce, Ficaja, Monacia-d'Orezza, Penta-di-Casinca, Piano, Piazzole, Piedicroce, Piedipartino, Pie-d'Orezza, Porri, La Porta, Pruno, Rapaggio, Scata, Stazzona, San-Damiano, San-Gavino-d'Ampugnani and Taglio-Isolaccio.

The Fium'Alto rises to the south of the  Monte San Petrone in the commune of Pie d'Orezza.
It flows southeast past the village of Pie d'Orezza, east past Piedicroce and Stazzona, then generally north and east to the town of Folelli (Penta-di-Casinca) and the sea.
The D71 road follows the upper part of the river, and then the D506 follows it for the remainder of its course.

Hydrology

Measurements of the river flow were taken at the Taglio-Isolaccio Acitaja station from 1960 to 2021.

Tributaries
The following streams (ruisseaux) are tributaries of the Bravone (ordered by length) and sub-tributaries:

 Pozzo Bianco 
 Molaghina 
 Arche 
 Cagnolo et de Teja 
 Lavatoio et de Noceta 
 Terciola 
 Penta 
  Forcione 
 Porcili 
 Chiarello 
 Funtana 
 Alzeta 
  Vetuste 
 Andegno 
 Verbicina 
 Mustaco 
 Pollace 
 Acquanili 
 Nicchiosa 
 Rossi 
 Polveroso 
 San Pancrazio 
 San Fiumento 
 Tigliola 
 Lavatoghio 
 Falongo 
 Croce 
 Funtana Maio 
 Migliarine 
 Isola 
 Palatina 
 Carpinete 
 Chiaraggio 
 Ortale 
 Piedipartino 
 Rustaggio 
 Volta 
 Porri 
 Onda 
 Fioraccio 
 Somerino 
 San Marcello 
 Scaffone 
 La Foata 
 Navacchi 
 Piazzi 
 Rividaldo 
 Piano 
 Acqua Riola 
 Padulelle 
 Falasco 
 Cogno Lello 
 Onda al Diavole 
 Finosa 
 Acqua Merla 
 Aja a e Calle 
 Aja Alle Porte 
 Colombino 
 Mugliani 
 Forcione 
 Suare Calle 
 Campo d'Arietto 
 Padule 
 Trovoli 
 Aja Rossa 
 Pisciancone

Notes

Sources

Rivers of Haute-Corse
Rivers of France
Coastal basins of the Tyrrhenian Sea in Corsica